Lente Loco (English translation: "Crazy Lens") is a hidden camera-comedy television show that aired on Univision from 1992 to 2001. Similar to the long-running Candid Camera, the show involved concealing cameras filming ordinary people being confronted with unusual situations. Carlos Marquez-Sterling was creator along with Manuel Elgarresta and Fernando Fiore, the original host of Lente Loco beginning in 1992. Model Odalys Garcia joined the show midway through its first season, remaining on the show for the rest of its run. George Ortuzar replaced Fiore as host in 1993. Ortuzar left in 1995 and was replaced by Raymond Arrieta for the remainder of its run.

References

External links
 

Univision original programming
1992 American television series debuts
2001 American television series endings
1990s American comedy television series
2000s American comedy television series
American hidden camera television series
Practical jokes